Aynabaji or Mirror Game is a Bangladeshi crime thriller film directed by Amitabh Reza Chowdhury and produced by Gousul Alam under the banner of Content Matters Production. The film was released on 30 September 2016 and received critical acclaim for its storytelling, cinematography, and performances. It is considered a milestone of Bangladeshi films in recent times.

The film follows the story of Ayna, a professional imposter who is hired to impersonate different individuals for financial gain. As Ayna delves deeper into his work, he becomes embroiled in a web of deceit, murder, and intrigue that threatens to unravel his life.

The film's director, Amitabh Reza Chowdhury, is a well-known figure in the Bangladeshi film industry, having previously directed the critically acclaimed film Jalal's Story (2014).

The lead charactes of the film are Chanchal Chowdhury, Masuma Rahman Nabila, and Partha Barua, they deliver strong performances into the characters.

The film's success can be attributed to its strong narrative, which keeps the audience engaged and guessing until the very end. The film's cinematography is also well received with the use of light and shadow creating a moody and atmospheric ambiance.

Aynabaji has received numerous awards and nominations, including the Best Film Award at the 2016 Dubai International Film Festival. Aynabaji was nominated for and won several accolades: at the 39th Bangladesh National Film Awards, the film won Best Director and Best Actor in a Leading Role and was nominated for many other categories. The film's success has also helped to raise the profile of the Bangladeshi film industry and highlights the potential for quality cinema to come out of the country.

In conclusion, Aynabaji was the highest grossing film of 2016 in Bangladesh and considered a breakthrough for Chanchal Chowdhury. It is the most critically acclaimed Bangladeshi film of all time.

It was remade into the Telugu language film Gayatri.

Plot 
The story is about Ayna, a struggling actor who gets to live his profession in real life after failing in his career. Gifted with the natural talents of acting, he is a man with a versatile character and can morph into anybody he wants. For this, he faces different circumstances in his life and thus the story evolves. It is also a story about the dark side of metro city Dhaka, depicting the constant combat between the ruling class and mass people living the city.

Cast 
 Chanchal Chowdhury as Sharafat Karim Ayna/Nizam Sayeed Chowdhury.
 Lutfur Rahman George as a dishonest businessman
 Masuma Rahman Nabila as Hridi
 Partha Barua as Saber, a news reporter
 Bijori Barkatullah
 Amitabh Reza Chowdhury
 Brindaban Das as prison officer 
 Jamil Ahmed as Saber's manservant
 Shohel Mondol
 Rizvi Hasan
 Heera Chowdhury
 Shawkat Osman
 Shovon Jaman
 Khairul Basar
 Iffat Trisha
 Raihan Chowdhury
 Gousul Alam (Guest Appearance)

Arifin Shuvoo, and Bijori Barkatullah makes guest appearances as AC Sajjad and Saber's separated wife respectively. Producer Gousul Alam and director Amitabh Reza Chowdhury have special appearances.

Production 
Gousul Alam Shaon had written the story for the film, while Anam Biswas adapted into a screenplay. Esha Yousuf was the executive producer of the film while Amitabh Reza is the director of the movie. The entire film was shot in Dhaka. Shooting of the film officially began in February 2015 and ended in August 2015. The film was released on 30 September 2016.

Soundtrack
The music for Aynabaji is composed by Arnob, Fuad, Habib & Chirkut Band. Songs have been well praised by critics.

Release 
The film was released on 30 September 2016 in Dhaka and later in Chittagong and other cities. It was screened at Marché du Film at 69th annual Cannes Film Festival, where it scored well. Aynabaji has won the award of the best film at United States's 11th Seattle South Asian Film Festival. The movie was pirated after it was released on Robi online TV. The film had a limited release in theaters in the United States, France, Canada and Australia.

Reception
Aynabaji received large positive reviews. The movie has received a good response from both critics and audience. Zahid Akbar from The Daily Star gave the film a 4 out of 5 star rating, saying "The film provides the viewers with an empathic view to its characters, which is coupled with brilliant storytelling making the audience wanting more." He praised the film for its story, cast, Chanchal Chowdhury's performance, and "impeccable" cinematography, but criticized the film for being too long.

Box office 
Rafi Hossain of The Daily Star described it as "an instant blockbuster hit". It did a record 91 shows in 10 days, the highest number for any Bangladeshi film. With an occupancy record of 98.89%, in eight weeks it collected BDT 20.3 million.

Awards 
Bangladesh National Film Awards 2016
Best Director
Best Actor
Best Screenplay
Best Cinematography
Best Editing
Best Sound Recording
Best Costume Design

Spin-off and remake/Influence  
Aynabaji has a spin-off TV series titled Aynabaji-Original series. Gayatri an official Indian Telugu remake of Aynabaji has been released on 9 February 2018.

See also
 List of Bangladeshi films of 2016

References

External links
 

2016 films
2016 psychological thriller films
Bengali-language Bangladeshi films
2016 black comedy films
Films scored by Habib Wahid
2010s Bengali-language films
Films whose writer won the Best Screenplay National Film Award (Bangladesh)
Films scored by Indradeep Dasgupta